Historis odius, the orion cecropian, is a species of crescents, checkerspots, anglewings, etc. in the butterfly family Nymphalidae.

Distribution

This species can be found in North America.The MONA or Hodges number for Historis odius is 4545.

Subspecies
These three subspecies belong to the species Historis odius:
 Historis odius dious Lamas, 1995 i g
 Historis odius odius (Fabricius, 1775) i g
 Historis odius orion Fabricius, 1775 c g
Data sources: i = ITIS, c = Catalogue of Life, g = GBIF, b = Bugguide.net

References

Further reading

External links

 

Coeini
Butterflies of Central America
Nymphalidae of South America
Butterflies of the Caribbean
Lepidoptera of Bolivia
Lepidoptera of Brazil
Lepidoptera of Colombia
Fauna of Cuba
Lepidoptera of Ecuador
Lepidoptera of French Guiana
Fauna of Haiti
Fauna of Jamaica
Butterflies of North America
Lepidoptera of Peru
Insects of Puerto Rico
Fauna of Suriname
Butterflies of Trinidad and Tobago
Lepidoptera of Venezuela
Fauna of the Amazon
Butterflies described in 1775
Articles created by Qbugbot
Taxa named by Johan Christian Fabricius